Grčarske Ravne is a settlement south of Dolenja Vas in the Municipality of Ribnica in southern Slovenia. The area is part of the traditional region of Lower Carniola and is now included in the Southeast Slovenia Statistical Region. The village was inhabited by Gottschee Germans who were expelled from the area in 1941 during the Second World War. In the 1960s all German tombstones were removed from the local cemetery in the neighbouring village of Grčarice.

References

External links
Grčarske Ravne on Geopedia
Pre–World War II map of Grčarske Ravne with oeconyms and family names

Populated places in the Municipality of Ribnica